The 1977–78 Northern Rugby Football League season was the 83rd season of rugby league football. Sixteen English clubs competed for the Northern Rugby Football League Championship with Widnes claiming the title by finishing the season on top of the League.

Season summary
League Champions were Widnes for the first time. Bradford Northern's last game was cancelled as Featherstone Rovers were on strike, consequently Bradford Northern finished 2nd on percentages.

Hull FC, New Hunslet, Bramley and Dewsbury were demoted to the Second Division.

Leeds were 14-12 Challenge Cup Winners over St. Helens.

John Player Trophy Winners were Warrington beating Widnes 9-4 in the final

Rugby League Premiership Trophy Winners were Bradford Northern beating Widnes 17-8 in the final.

BBC2 Floodlit Trophy Winners were Hull Kingston Rovers beating St. Helens 26-11 in the final.

2nd Division Champions were Leigh, and they, Barrow, Rochdale Hornets and Huddersfield were promoted to the First Division.

Workington Town (from Cumbria) beat Wigan 16–13 to win the Lancashire County Cup, and Castleford beat Featherstone Rovers 17–7 to win the Yorkshire County Cup.

League Tables

First Division Championship

Second Division Championship

Challenge Cup

Leeds beat St Helens 14-12 in the final played at Wembley Stadium on Saturday 13 May 1978 before a crowd of 96,000.

This was Leeds’ eleventh Cup Final win in fifteen appearances and their second in successive years.

League Cup

Premiership

Statistics
The following are the top points scorers in the 1977–78 season.

Most tries

Most goals (including drop goals)

References

Sources
1977–78 Rugby Football League season at wigan.rlfans.com
The Challenge Cup at The Rugby Football League website

1977 in English rugby league
1978 in English rugby league
Northern Rugby Football League seasons